Greg Sacks (born November 3, 1952) is an American former stock car racing driver. He is married and has three children. He lives in Ormond Beach, Florida.  He and his sons are partners in Grand Touring Vodka.

Sacks has spent most of his career as a research and development (R&D) driver for many NASCAR teams. He won the 1985 Firecracker 400 at Daytona International Speedway acting as an R&D driver for DiGard Motorsports.

Modifieds
Early in his racing career, Sacks was a successful driver in what is now the NASCAR Whelen Modified Tour. Competing from 1980 to 1983, he won 17 races at Stafford Motor Speedway. 1992 was an especially good year for him, as he won the track championship that year, as well as the Spring Sizzler, The Ferrera 100 and the Fall Final. Greg also won the Dogwood Classic at Martinsville Speedway, the Bud Classic at Oswego Speedway, the Thompson 300 at Thompson International Speedway, the World Series of Asphalt at Thompson Speedway and the Race of Champions at Pocono Raceway.

In 1983, he made his NASCAR Winston Cup Series debut in the Pepsi 400 at Daytona in the No. 5 car owned and sponsored by his father, Arnie.  He only completed nineteen laps until experiencing engine failure, finishing 38th out of 40 cars. Sacks competed in four more events that season, posting a best finish of 17th in the Champion Spark Plug 400 at Michigan International Speedway, the only race he finished that year.

Success in the 1980s

In 1984, Sacks made a full attempt at the NASCAR Winston Cup Series, once again in a car owned by his father, only now it ran as No. 51. Sacks made 29 out of the 30 races, finished 19th in points and runner-up to Rusty Wallace for the NASCAR Rookie of the Year award. 1985 got off to a rough start for Sacks. After the first four races, his father's team folded.

Seven races later, Sacks was able to drive the No. 49 car owned by 1966 NASCAR Rookie of the Year James Hylton. Before the Firecracker 400, DiGard Motorsports asked Sacks to drive their R&D car. Sacks qualified ninth and defeated pole-sitter Bill Elliott to earn his only NASCAR Winston Cup Series victory. The win was considered to be one of NASCAR's biggest upsets, as Sacks's car was only scheduled to run a set number of laps before going behind the wall to make changes, but his car kept competing for the win, therefore DiGard decided to let Sacks race as normal. After DiGard's regular driver Bobby Allison quit the team days after the race, the team let Sacks finish the season in their regular car. The next year, Sacks found himself running a limited schedule as DiGard slowly went bankrupt.

In 1987, he signed on to drive the No. 50 Pontiac for the Dingman Brothers, where he struggled with qualifying for each race. Three-quarters of the way through 1988, Sacks left the team to drive for Buddy Baker's team, the No. 88 Oldsmobile. He came close to a victory at Bristol in 1989, where he led 119 laps only to lose the lead to Rusty Wallace with 40 laps to go. Although he posted two top ten finishes in the first ten races of the 1989 season, Sacks was replaced by rookie Jimmy Spencer. Sacks was unemployed for a brief period, then joined on with Tom Winkle's No. 48 Pontiac for most of the season, joining with Hendrick Motorsports for the Autoworks 500 at Phoenix International Raceway as part of the driving team gathering in-race footage for the "Days of Thunder" movie.

1990–1997
Sacks started off 1990 in a familiar situation with no ride, driving part-time for Hendrick's development team. He participated in the Busch Clash at Daytona and at Darlington in the TranSouth 500, driving the No. 46 'City Chevrolet' Lumina "Days of Thunder" movie car. Four races later, Sacks was rewarded with a part-time ride at Hendrick, driving the No. 18 Ultra Slim-Fast Chevrolet, finishing second at Talladega Superspeedway in the Winston 500. After Darrell Waltrip was injured in a practice crash at Daytona, Sacks drove the No. 17 car for three races—the Champion Spark Plug 400, Busch 500, and the Heinz Southern 500, with a best finish of second at Michigan during this three-race stretch.  The highlight of his season was winning the pole position at the Pepsi Firecracker 400.  Following a crash in practice by teammate Waltrip, NASCAR officials noted that several teams had made modifications, and NASCAR made the teams spot-weld the blocks back into place, causing a loss of power. Trying to make up for lost speed, Sacks caused a 23-car pileup at the end of the first lap, taking out eight cars, including Sacks. No one was seriously hurt in that race, but it gave Sacks a reputation of being an excellent qualifier, as shown in 1989, when he won the pole in just his second Busch Series race. Sacks was signed to a three-year deal to drive the #18 for Hendrick and Paul Newman, with backing from Ultra Slim-Fast, but following the season Ultra Slim-Fast pulled out, the team was folded, and Sacks was released.

Sacks started off 1991 at the Daytona 500 driving his own No. 18 car, but crashed early in the race. He ran ten more races that year in the No. 47 Oldsmobile for Derick Close, posting two top-twenty finishes. He started 1992 with Larry Hedrick Motorsports, but suffered injuries in a lap five crash at the Champion Spark Plug 400, and only drove one race for the rest of the season. He moved on to Tri-Star Motorsports in 1993, and finished sixth at the DieHard 500. In 1994, Sacks set the track record at Atlanta when he won the pole. Nineteen-ninety four also marked the second time in his Cup career that he completed the full schedule, piloting the No. 77 Ford owned by D.K. Ulrich. Sacks raced part-time in the Cup and Busch series over the next two years, winning a Busch Series event in a one-race deal for Diamond Ridge Motorsports at Talladega Superspeedway in 1996. The next year, he started out driving the No. 20 Ford for championship owner Harry Ranier, but was soon released as sponsorship funding ended; following his release, he sued the team, claiming breach of contract. Later in the season, he filled in for rookie driver Robby Gordon, who had suffered burns in the Indianapolis 500. After Gordon was released later in the year, Sacks finished the season for the team.

Struggles
In 1998, it looked like Sacks had finally found a steady ride, driving the No. 98 Ford for Cale Yarborough. However, on lap 136 of the Texas 500 at Texas Motor Speedway, Sacks lost control of his car and wrecked, suffering life-threatening injuries. He missed the rest of the season.

Sacks made his return in 1999 in the Busch Series, but only qualified for one of the several races he attempted. Sacks tried his hand at Winston Cup again in 2000, attempting that year's Daytona 500 in the No. 96 Chevrolet. He did not make the field. After making sporadic races in modifieds, Sacks announced his return to the Winston Cup Series and Busch Series in the summer of 2002, driving the No. 05 Chevy. Sacks teamed with Loren Fossie to form "Team Franchisit/Sacks Racing". Originally set to debut at the Brickyard 400, the date was pushed to the fall race at Charlotte Motor Speedway. Nothing was ever heard from the team since, and it is not clear if the team was originally planned as a marketing tool for Franchisit.

In 2004, Sacks formed Daytona Speed Inc., with Ed Raabe and James Wilsberg. Making its first attempt at Chicagoland Speedway, the team did not make a race until the Pennsylvania 500 the next month. In February 2005, Raabe departed to form his own race team (Chevrolet), leaving all of the (Dodge) Daytona Speed equipment in the care of Sacks. Sacks ran both Pocono races in 2005, and finished 43rd in both of them.

The team attempted a part-time schedule in 2006, but failed to make the field for any race. In early 2007, an arbitrator forced his sponsor Who's Your Daddy? to pay over a million dollars to Sacks after a contract violation.

2008–present

2008
Sacks was to attempt a partial schedule in the ARCA/ReMAX series in 2008. He tried to qualify for the ARCA race at Daytona but missed the field after posting the 48th best qualifying time.

2010
Sacks drove the No. 88 car owned by Dale Earnhardt Jr. in the Nationwide Series Subway Jalapeño 250 on July 2 at Daytona. Sacks finished 21st after qualifying 7th.

Sacks and his family, who own Grand Touring Vodka, sponsored JR Motorsports for the 2011 Nationwide Series season.

Motorsports career results

NASCAR
(key) (Bold – pole position awarded by qualifying time. Italics – pole position earned by points standings or practice time. * – most laps led.)

Nextel Cup Series

Daytona 500

Nationwide Series

Craftsman Truck Series

ARCA Re/Max Series
(key) (Bold – Pole position awarded by qualifying time. Italics – Pole position earned by points standings or practice time. * – Most laps led.)

References

Where Are They Now

External links
 Unofficial website 
 
 

Living people
1952 births
People from Mattituck, New York
Racing drivers from New York (state)
NASCAR drivers
NASCAR team owners
ARCA Menards Series drivers
People from Ormond Beach, Florida
Hendrick Motorsports drivers
JR Motorsports drivers